Burghley may refer to:

William Cecil, 1st Baron Burghley (1520–1598), chief minister of queen Elizabeth I of England
Burghley House, a sixteenth-century country house in Cambridgeshire, built for the above
Burghley Horse Trials, an annual three-day event
Burghley, an abandoned English village, believed to be under Burghley House
David Cecil, 6th Marquess of Exeter, also known as David Burghley, British Conservative politician and 1928 Summer Olympics 400m hurdles champion

See also
 Birley (disambiguation)
 Burley (disambiguation)
 Burleigh (disambiguation)
 Berlei